FC Metalurh Kupyansk is an amateur club from Kupyansk competing at the regional competitions of Kharkiv Oblast. 

The club was founded in 1971 by the Kupyansk Foundry. The club is one of the most dedicated clubs that competed at national (republican) amateur competitions (Ukrainian football championship among amateurs) being one of the three that spent there over 20 seasons and yielding only to FC Shakhtar Sverdlovsk.

Honours
Ukrainian football championship among amateurs
 Runners-up (3): 1975, 1977, 1986

Football championship of Kharkiv Oblast
 Winners (12): 1973, 1975–1981, 1986, 1987, 1989, 1991
 Runners-up (1): 1972

'Kharkiv Oblast Football Cup
 Holders (2): 1984, 1988

References

External links
 Vorotinskyi, V. Kupyansk is a football city''. Vremya.
 2016 Kharkiv Oblast Football championship 1 half, 2 half

 
Metalurh Kupyansk
Metalurh Kupyansk
Metallurgy association football clubs in Ukraine